The Sumoqagan mine is a large mine located in the northern China in Inner Mongolia. Sumoqagan represents one of the largest fluorite reserves in China having estimated reserves of 10.3 million tonnes of ore grading 53.9% fluorite.

References 

Fluorite mines in China